Dimitris Kravaritis (born 28 March 1972) is a retired Greek water polo player who played his entire career for Olympiacos. He is the current head coach of Greece Junior national water polo team, whom he led to the bronze medal at the 2015 European Games at Baku and the current assistant coach of Greece men's national water polo team as well. He is also the head of Olympiacos Water Polo Academy.

As a player, Kravaritis played his entire career for Olympiacos, where he won numerous titles including the 2002 LEN Champions League. He was also a member of the Greece men's national water polo team. After his retirement, he became head of Olympiacos Academy. Besides his work at the Academy, he was assistant coach of Olympiacos under coaches Vangelis Pateros and Thodoris Vlachos. In 2014 he became assistant coach of Greece men's national water polo team and in 2015 head coach of the Greece Junior national water polo team, whom he led to the bronze medal at the 2015 European Games at Baku.

References

External links
  

1972 births
Living people
Olympiacos Water Polo Club players
Greek male water polo players
Greek water polo coaches
Water polo coaches
Place of birth missing (living people)